San Pablo de Lípez Municipality is the first municipal section of the Sur Lípez Province in the Potosí Department in Bolivia. Its seat is San Pablo de Lípez.

Geography 
Other mountains are listed below:

Subdivision 
The municipality consists of the following cantons: 
 Quetena Grande - 621 inhabitants (2001)
 San Antonio de Lípez - 505 inhabitants
 San Pablo de Lípez - 1,397 inhabitants

The people 
The people are predominantly indigenous citizens of Quechua descent.

References

External links 
San Pablo de Lípez Municipality: population data and map

Municipalities of Potosí Department